The Ballade No. 2 in B minor, S. 171, is a piano composition by Franz Liszt, written in 1853.

Claudio Arrau, who studied under Liszt's disciple Martin Krause, maintained that the Ballade was based on the Greek myth of Hero and Leander, with the piece's chromatic ostinati representing the sea: "You really can perceive how the journey turns more and more difficult each time. In the fourth night he drowns. Next, the last pages are a transfiguration".

The ballad is based largely on two themes: a broad opening melody underpinned by menacing chromatic rumbles in the lower register of the keyboard, and a luminous ensuing chordal meditation.  These themes are repeated a half-step lower; then march-like triplet-rhythms unleash a flood of virtuosity.  Eventually, Liszt transforms the opening melody into a rocking major-key cantabile and reiterates this with ever-more grandiose exultation. The luminous chords provide a contemplative close.

References

External links 
 

Compositions by Franz Liszt
Compositions in B minor
Piano ballades